Noeline Mabel Brown  (born 3 October 1938), credited also as Noelene Brown, is an Australian actress and comedian. She has appeared in numerous films, television shows, theatrical productions and radio programs dating back to 1959.

Life and career 
Brown gained local notoriety in Sydney as a cast member of the famous Phillip St Revues and the popular melodrama productions at the Music Hall, a Sydney theatre-restaurant, in the early 1960s. She came to national prominence after joining the cast of the pioneering Australian satirical TV sketch comedy series The Mavis Bramston Show (1964 -1968). After a stint in the UK she secured a regular role in the hit TV sitcom My Name's McGooley, What's Yours?, starring alongside Gordon Chater, John Meillon and Judi Farr.

Throughout the 1970s, Brown enjoyed great popularity in Australia as a co-star of the satirical television and radio series The Naked Vicar Show and the quiz show Graham Kennedy's Blankety Blanks. She was a regular panelist in the ABC game show Would You Believe? (1970–74). In 1978 she won a Logie Award for the most popular NSW female personality.

During 2005 Noeline Brown also released her own autobiography titled "Noeline Longtime Memoir" published by Allen & Unwin.

In 2006, she was a competitor in Dancing with the Stars, and played the role of Leonara Biviano in the Australian film Razzle Dazzle: A Journey into Dance in 2007. Her earlier film career included roles in Walkabout (1971) and Emma's War (1985).

In 2007, she appeared in Bruce Venables' and Richard Fidler's play Flying Solo, directed by Judy Nunn, starring alongside Barry Quin, Paula Duncan, Enda Markey and Jacinta John. She was portrayed by Jane Allsop in the television movie The King, about the life of Graham Kennedy.

In 2008, she won the Norman Kessell award for best performance for her portrayal of Florence Foster Jenkins in  Peter Quilter's play Glorious. She was also appointed Australia's first Ambassador for Ageing by the Rudd government.

In 2009, she co-starred with Barry Creyton in Peter Quilter's play Duet at the Ensemble Theatre in Sydney.

She is a longtime member of the Australian Labor Party and appeared in It's Time advertisements for the party before the 1972 election. She has twice (1999 and 2003) run for New South Wales Parliament as an endorsed Labor Party candidate.

In 2017 she published a memoir, Living the 1960s, about her life in that decade when living in Marrickville in Sydney.

Noeline's most recent radio interviews have been for ABC Radio during 2018 and Stages podcast with Peter Eyers in 2019.

Discography

Albums

Personal life
In 1976, Brown married one of the writer/producers of The Naked Vicar Show, Tony Sattler. The couple were close friends of Graham Kennedy; Noeline was present when Kennedy died in 2005. She and Sattler have lived in Bowral for many years, and Kennedy moved there to be closer to them. When Kennedy's health began to fail, Sattler and Brown reportedly contacted former Nine Network boss Kerry Packer to appeal for financial support to care for the ailing star (Kennedy having earned many millions of dollars for Packer and Nine in his heyday); Packer declined to assist Kennedy financially but, after the story became public, an anonymous benefactor (later revealed as former Nine Network chief Sam Chisholm) came forward and donated a substantial sum (reportedly AU$150,000) for Kennedy's ongoing support and care.

Awards
In November 2017, Brown was honoured with the 2017 Equity Lifetime Achievement Award by the Equity National Performers Committee.
In 2020, Brown was awarded in the Australia Day honours "For services to the Performing Arts" In April 2020, Brown was honoured with a stamp in the Australia Post Legends of Comedy issue.

FILM

TELEVISION

References

External links

1938 births
Living people
Australian women comedians
Comedians from Sydney
Australian film actresses
Australian radio personalities
Australian women radio presenters
Australian stage actresses
Australian television actresses
Actresses from Sydney
Recipients of the Medal of the Order of Australia